Nepos is a Latin word originally meaning “grandson” or “descendant", that evolved with time to signify "nephew". The word gives rise to the term nepotism. 

It may also refer to:
 Cornelius Nepos, a Roman biographer
 Julius Nepos, sometimes considered the last Emperor of the Western Roman Empire
 Aulus Platorius Nepos, governor of Britannia under Hadrian
 Nepos (Roman governor), during the reign of the emperor Trajan
 The apocryphal Book of Nepos, written by an Egyptian bishop of the same name
 Nepos, a village in Feldru Commune, Bistriţa-Năsăud County, Romania

de:Nepos#Namensträger